Charaxes schiltzei is a butterfly in the family Nymphalidae. It is found in the Democratic Republic of the Congo, Uganda, Rwanda and Burundi.

Similar species
Charaxes subornatus is in the  Charaxes eupale species group (clade). The clade members are:

Charaxes subornatus
Charaxes eupale
Charaxes dilutus
Charaxes montis
Charaxes minor 
Charaxes schiltzei 
Charaxes schultzei  
Charaxes virescens
Bouyer et al., 2008 erected the genus Viridixes Bouyer & Vingerhoedt, 2008 to accommodate species belonging to the eupale species group.

Realm
Afrotropical realm

References

Bouyer, T., Zakharov, E., Rougerie, R. & Vingerhoedt, E. (2008): Les Charaxes du groupe eupale : description d’un nouveau genre, révision et approche génétique (Lepidoptera, Nymphalidae, Charaxinae) Entomologica Africana Hors Série 3:1-32.

External links
 African Charaxes/Charaxes Africains  Eric Vingerhoedt images of eupale group
Images of C. schiltzei Royal Museum for Central Africa (Albertine Rift Project)
Charaxes schiltzei images at Bold includes image of the holotype.

Butterflies described in 1991
schiltzei